A constitutional referendum was held in Haiti on 30 January 1971. Before the referendum, the Haitian parliament had voted in favour of lowering the age limit for becoming president from 40 years to 20, as well as confirming Jean-Claude Duvalier, son of ailing Dictator François Duvalier as 21 years of age, which would allow him to succeed his father. The referendum asked Haitians the question:

It was reportedly approved by 100% of voters, with no votes against officially recognized. London based publication the Latin America reported that there were 2 invalid ballots while "one brave man voted against".

Results
Out of approximately 4,7 million inhabitants, 2,391,916 voters voted at the referendum.

References

1971 in Haiti
1971 referendums
Initiatives and referendums in Haiti
Constitutional referendums in Haiti
January 1971 events in North America